Notyst may refer to the following places in Poland:

Notyst Dolny
Notyst Mały
Notyst Wielki